Jakarta Faces, formerly Jakarta Server Faces and JavaServer Faces (JSF) is a Java specification for building component-based user interfaces for web applications and was formalized as a standard through the Java Community Process being part of the Java Platform, Enterprise Edition. It is also an MVC web framework that simplifies the construction of user interfaces (UI) for server-based applications by using reusable UI components in a page.

JSF 2.x uses Facelets as its default templating system. Users of the software may also choose to employ technologies such as XUL, or Java.  JSF 1.x uses JavaServer Pages (JSP) as its default templating system.

History

In 2001, the original Java Specification Request (JSR) for the technology that ultimately became JavaServer Faces proposed developing a package with the name javax.servlet.ui

In June 2001, JavaWorld would report on Amy Fowler's team's design of "the JavaServer Faces API" (also known as "Moonwalk") as "an application framework for creating Web-based user interfaces".

Latest developments
Facelets (which was designed specifically for Java Server Faces) was adopted as the official view technology for JSF 2.0. This eliminates the life-cycle conflicts that existed with JSP, forcing workarounds by Java developers.

The new JSF developments also provide wide accessibility to Java annotations such as @ManagedBean, @ManagedProperty and @FacesComponent that removes the need for faces-config.xml, in all cases except framework extension. Navigation is also simplified, removing the need for faces-config.xml navigation cases. Page transitions can be invoked simply by passing the name of the desired View or Facelet.

The addition of Partial State Saving and Document Object Model (DOM) updates are part of the built-in standardized AJAX support.

The latest JSF release has built-in support for handling resources like images, CSS and Javascript, allowing artifacts to be included with component libraries, separated into JAR files, or simply co-located into a consistent place within the Web application. This includes logical naming and versioning of resources.

JSF 2.0 also includes a number of other changes like adding support for events, separate development, staging, and production modes, similar to RAILS_ENV in Ruby on Rails, and significantly expanding the standard set of components.

Update history
 JSF 4.0 (2022-05-15)  Major features: Deleted some deprecated things (native managed beans, native EL references), no extended view by default, added ClientWindowScoped
 JSF 3.0.0 (2020-10-28)  Package name changed from Javax to Jakarta.
 JSF 2.3 (2019-09-10)  The first release of the Jakarta Server Pages API for Jakarta EE.Neither the API nor the behavior has changed.
 JSF 2.3 (2017-03-28) – Major features: search Expressions, extensionless URLs, bean validation for complete classes, push communication using WebSocket, enhanced integration with CDI.
 JSF 2.2 (2013-05-21) – Introduced new concepts like stateless views, page flow and the ability to create portable resource contracts.
 JSF 2.1 (2010-11-22) – Maintenance release 2 of JSF 2.0. Only a very minor number of specification changes.
 JSF 2.0 (2009-07-01) – Major release for ease of use, enhanced functionality, and performance. Coincides with Java EE 6.
 JSF 1.2 (2006-05-11) – Many improvements to core systems and APIs. Coincides with Java EE 5. Initial adoption into Java EE.
 JSF 1.1 (2004-05-27) – Bug-fix release. No specification changes.
 JSF 1.0 (2004-03-11) – Initial specification released.

How it works
Based on a component-driven UI design-model, JavaServer Faces uses XML files called view templates or Facelets views. The FacesServlet processes requests, loads the appropriate view template, builds a component tree, processes events, and renders the response (typically in the HTML language) to the client. The state of UI components and other objects of scope interest is saved at the end of each request in a process called stateSaving (note: transient true), and restored upon next creation of that view. Either the client or the server side can save objects and states.

JSF and AJAX

JSF is often used together with AJAX, a Rich Internet application development technique. AJAX is a combination of web development techniques and technologies that make it possible to create rich user interfaces. The user interface components in Mojarra (the JSF reference implementation) and Apache MyFaces were originally developed for HTML only, and AJAX had to be added via JavaScript. This has changed, however:

Because JSF supports multiple output formats, AJAX-enabled components can easily be added to improve user interfaces created with JSF. The JSF 2.0 specification provides built-in support for AJAX by standardizing the AJAX request lifecycle and providing simple development interfaces to AJAX events. The specification allows an event triggered by the client to go through  validation, conversion, and method invocation, before returning the result to the browser via an XML DOM update.

JSF 2 includes support for graceful degradation when JavaScript is disabled in the browser.

AJAX-enabled components and frameworks
The following companies and projects offer AJAX-based JSF frameworks or component libraries:

 Apache MyFaces – The Apache Foundation JSF implementation with AJAX components
 Backbase Enterprise AJAX – JSF Edition – AJAX framework
 BootsFaces Open source JSF Framework based on Bootstrap
 IBM Notes – XPages
 ICEfaces – open-source, Java JSF extension framework and rich components, AJAX without JavaScript
 JBoss RichFaces (derived from and replaces AJAX4jsf) – AJAX-enabled JSF components for layout, file upload, forms, inputs and many other features. It reached its end-of-life in June 2016.
 OmniFaces – open-source JSF utility library
 OpenFaces – AJAX framework with JSF components
 Oracle ADF Faces Rich Client – Oracle Application Development Framework
 PrimeFaces – AJAX framework with JSF components
 Sun Java BluePrints AJAX components 
 ZK – AJAX framework with JSF components

Criticisms

ThoughtWorks, 2014 
In their January 2014 Technology Radar publication, ThoughtWorks wrote:

Rebuttal 
In February 2014, Çağatay Çivici (PrimeFaces Lead) responded to ThoughtWorks criticisms in a post titled JSF is not what you've been told anymore. Çivici argues that improvements in JSF over the years offer many features that embrace modern web development, providing the option to write your own JavaScript, HTML, and CSS. Also regarding state, Çivici wrote:

DZone, 2014 
In the article published November 2014 in the DZone website, titled "Why You Should Avoid JSF", Jens Schauder wrote:

TheServerSide, 2016 
In February 2016, the enterprise Java community website TheServerSide published an article recommending against the use of JSF, whose use could compromise the quality of the final product. The article ellaborated on five reasons:

 Simple tasks become difficult;
 JSF lacks flexibility;
 The learning curve is steep;
 Incompatibility with standard Java technologies; and
 Primitive AJAX support.

References

External links

 
Java enterprise platform
Java specification requests